La Marche is a commune in the Nièvre department in central France. La Marche station has rail connections to Nevers and Cosne-sur-Loire.

Demographics
On 1 January 2019, the estimated population was 561.

See also
Communes of the Nièvre department

References

Communes of Nièvre